Indian Institute of Technology Dharwad (IIT Dharwad or IIT DH) is an autonomous engineering and technology institute in Dharwad, Karnataka, India. IIT Dharwad started functioning from July 2016 in a temporary campus, previously of the Water and Land Management Institute (WALMI) in Belur Industrial Area, on the outskirts of Dharwad city. It was formally inaugurated on 28 August 2016. For the academic year 2016–2017, the institute offered B.Tech courses in three branches, namely. Electrical Engineering, Computer Science, and Mechanical Engineering. The year 2021 saw the introduction of an additional branch, Engineering physics. As of 2022, the institute expanded to provide four additional courses of study, namely Chemical and Biochemical engineering, Mathematics and Computing, Civil and Infrastructure engineering, and Interdisciplinary Sciences.

As part of the mentorship plan, IIT Bombay is the mentor institute for IIT Dharwad. The HRD Ministry has set up an IIT monitoring cell at IIT Bombay. The committee members were designated as officials on special duty to supervise the process of setting up IIT Dharwad.

History
The late Union Human Resources Development Minister S. R. Bommai had moved the proposal to the Centre seeking an IIT in Dharwad in the 1990s. In 1998, a committee headed by former ISRO chairman and space scientist Udupi Ramachandra Rao submitted its report recommending an IIT in Hubballi-Dharwad. Union finance Minister Arun Jaitley in the 2015-16 union budget, sanctioned a budget for IIT for Karnataka state and the state government suggested three locations. The short-listed cities were Dharwad, Mysuru, and Raichur.

Campus
 
IIT Dharwad is initially functioning out of the campus of the Water and Land Management Institute (WALMI) in Dharwad near the Karnataka High Court Bench. A permanent building is coming up at Chikkamaligawad village.

Around 500 acres belonging to KIADB near Mummigatti on the Pune-Bangalore National Highway off Dharwad was identified for the IIT campus, but that deal was cancelled due to legal hurdles. The State Cabinet decided to allot 470 acres of land at Kelageri village adjunct to Mammigahtti Industrial Area in Dharwad district. The historic Kittur Fort is 20 kilometers from the campus.

IIT Dharwad permanent campus was inaugurated on 12 March 2023 by the Prime Minister Narendra Modi to the public which is the first green and smart IIT in India.

The city also houses educational institutions like Karnatak University, Karnatak College, University of Agricultural Sciences, SDMCET . Also, new institutes like the IIIT Dharwad are coming up in the twin cities of Hubballi-Dharwad. There is also the NTTF tool and die making educational institute at Dharwad.

There is an airport at Gokul Road, Hubballi, the twin city of Dharwad. The airport has air services connecting to Ahmedabad, Bengaluru, Chennai, Hindon-Delhi, Goa, Hyderabad, Kannur, Kochi, Mumbai and Tirupati. There is a railway station at Dharwad through which trains from Bengaluru to Goa run. Hubballi Junction is the major railway junction which has train connections to Kochuveli, Bengaluru, Mumbai, Hyderabad, Varanasi, Howrah, Chennai, Hazrat Nizamuddin, Kolhapur, Solapur, Vijayawada and Vasco among others.  Also, Hubballi city is the headquarters of South Western Railway zone of Indian Railways.

Organisation and administration

Departments, centers, and schools 
Nearly 60 seats each in the streams of BTech in Computer Science, Electrical, and Mechanical engineering are available at the institute. Classes began on 15 July 2016, along with the other IITs across the country.

A new B.Tech programme in Engineering Physics with ~15 seats has been started in the Autumn 2021 Semester. As of 2022, the institute expanded to provide four additional courses of study, namely Chemical and Biochemical engineering, Mathematics and Computing, Civil and Infrastructure engineering, and Interdisciplinary Sciences. The student intake as of 2022 has increased to 310 including supernumerary.

In January 2022, IIT Dharwad established the Global Center of Excellence in Affordable and Clean Energy (GCoE-ACE) in partnership with Honeywell Hometown Solutions India Foundation (HHSIF), the philanthropic arm of Honeywell.

Academics

Programmes

The institute conducts educational programs leading to the degrees of Bachelor of Technology (B. Tech.), Master of Science (MS) and Ph.D. in the following areas:

Rankings
As the institute is new, it has not yet been included in any rankings.

Student life

Cultural and non-academic activities
IIT Dharwad has many student clubs like Open Student Society (OSS), Astronomy club, Photography club, Robotics Club, Music Club. CodeChef has a campus community called 'AvadaCodavra'.

See also

 Indian Institutes of Technology
 Indian Institute of Technology Bombay
 List of universities in India

References

External links

Dharwad
Universities and colleges in Dharwad
Educational institutions established in 2016
2016 establishments in Karnataka
Engineering colleges in Dharwad
Universities and colleges in Hubli-Dharwad